Forest Home may refer to:

 Forest Home (Four Forks, Louisiana), listed on the NRHP in Louisiana
 Forest Home (Trinity, Alabama), listed on the NRHP in Alabama
 Forest Home, Belize, a village in Toledo District, Belize
 Forest Home, California
 Forest Home, Amador County, California, former community in Amador County
 Forest Home, San Bernardino County, California
 Forest Home, New York
 Forest Home Historic District, Forest Home, NY, listed on the NRHP in New York

It may also refer to: 

 Forest Home Cemetery (Chicago), Forest Park, Illinois
 Forest Home Cemetery, Milwaukee. WI, listed on the NRHP in Wisconsin
 Forest Home Farms, in San Ramon, California, listed on the NRHP in California
 Forest Home Plantation, Centreville, MS, listed on the NRHP in Mississippi
 Forest Home Township, Michigan